Kenneth Frank Rose (born June 9, 1961) is a former professional American football linebacker in the National Football League for the New York Jets, Cleveland Browns, and the Philadelphia Eagles. Rose graduated from Christian Brothers High School (Sacramento, California). He attended the University of Nevada, Las Vegas and played alongside Randall Cunningham, among others.

Professional football 
Rose caught on with the Saskatchewan Roughriders of the Canadian Football League (CFL). Following two seasons there, he played a season with the Tampa Bay Bandits of the United States Football League (USFL). Rose was interested in playing for the NFL and attended several training camps in the mid-1980s. Ken Rose joined the New York Jets in 1987 during the strike by the players union and was one of the few players who stayed on the roster. Rose remained with the Jets through 1989. In 1990, he split playing time with the Cleveland Browns and the Philadelphia Eagles, released by the Browns (along with head coach Bud Carson) after the seventh game and signing with the Eagles for their final 8 regular-season games. Rose remained with the Eagles through the 1994 season. Ken Rose later became a special teams coach for the New York Jets until 1996.

Martial arts
Rose is also a martial artist, having studied Muay Thai and other Mixed Martial Arts disciplines from a young age. Rose fights professionally in Thailand and owns a gym in Thousand Oaks, California.

References

1961 births
Living people
American football linebackers
American players of Canadian football
New York Jets players
Cleveland Browns players
New York Jets coaches
Philadelphia Eagles players
Saskatchewan Roughriders players
Tampa Bay Bandits players
UNLV Rebels football players
Players of American football from Sacramento, California
Players of Canadian football from Sacramento, California
National Football League replacement players